The Jersey City Armory is located at 678 Montgomery Street near McGinley Square in Jersey City, New Jersey. In addition to being a military training and mustering facility of the New Jersey National Guard (New Jersey National Guard 2/113 Infantry 250 Jersey City), the WPA era armory has long been used as a sports arena, particularly for boxing, basketball, and track and field events, and more recently mixed martial arts.

Under the auspices of the New Jersey Department of Military and Veteran Affairs, the armory is leased to the city for community and political events and extracurricular sports programs. It has also been used as a film studio.

Architecture
The armory was built to replace the previous Fourth Regiment Armory which had burned down in 1927. An arch at Pershing Field park in Jersey City Heights is a portion of the entrance façade from the previous armory.

The Works Progress Administration project was completed in 1937, the same year the city's other big sports venue, the since demolished Roosevelt Stadium. The three-story beaux-arts structure features English Renaissance details with a granite base, brick exterior wall, and terra cotta trim. The massive interior is 175,000 square feet. Between 2005 and 2009 the armory underwent a  refurbishment which included state-of-the-art running surface, a new basketball court, new lighting and a four-sided scoreboard as well installation of new locker rooms and restrooms. In 2010, the sidewalks around the armory were repaired.

Notable events
The New Jersey National Guard maintains 64 armories within 46 communities, as part of New Jersey Department of Military and Veteran Affairs. Some are used for non-military activities, such as the Teaneck Armory, home to the New Jersey Nets in their first season.

Both the former and current armories in Jersey City have played an important role in Hudson County and New Jersey's pugilist past, which includes the 1921 Dempsey – Carpentier world heavyweight championship at Boyle's Thirty Acres. The current armory has hosted many bouts, including those with James J. Braddock, Sonny Liston, and Chuck Wepner, aka Bayonne Bleeder. In a 1979 fund raiser for the Jersey City Medical Center then Mayor of Jersey City Thomas F. X. Smith challenged Muhammad Ali to an exhibition bout, and went three rounds before a crowd of 8,000. In 2010, the first fight card in three decades returned to the Armory with the mixed martial arts Urban Conflict Championship. Trials for the World Professional Jiu-Jitsu Cup 2011 took place in February 2011.

The arena has also hosted basketball games, including those played by St. Anthony High School, ten-time winners of New Jersey's Tournament of Champions and considered one of the United States' top high school basketball teams. The school's long-time Naismith Memorial Basketball Hall of Fame coach, Bob Hurley, was instrumental in bringing about the renewal of the court and other renovations.

Since 2005 the annual Dan Finn Classic, a day of basketball games, has taken place at the Armory. The event is in memory Dan Finn, a St. Peter's Preparatory School graduate who died in an accident and, as organ donor, was able to assist four other people after his death.

Prior to the opening of the Yanitelli Center on its campus nearby, Saint Peter's University used the venue for its home games, and still occasionally uses the venue for high-profile games.

Many local, regional, and state (New Jersey State Interscholastic Athletic Association) track meets are also held at the venue. Professional wrestling events produced by Jersey All Pro Wrestling have taken place in the arena as well.

In 2004, the Armory was the site of memorial service for deceased Jersey City mayor Glenn Dale Cunningham attended by 5,000, and where in 2007 his wife Sandra Bolden Cunningham launched her political career.

In 2006, a funeral attended by thousands took place at the armory for Jersey City Police officer Robert Nguyen. He and his partner, Shawn Carson, had died on December 25 after their patrol car plunged in the Hackensack River from the Lincoln Highway Hackensack River Bridge which they were not informed had been opened. Along with traditional bagpipes, Buddhist monks participated in the ceremony, reflecting Nguyen's Vietnamese-American background.

Film studio
The floor space and height of the Armory has led to it being used as a temporary studio for many projects, including Robert De Niro's A Bronx Tale, the Faye Dunaway thriller Eyes Of Laura Mars, Laura Brannigan's music video "Self-Control", Woody Allen's Deconstructing Harry, Terry Kinney's Diminished Capacity, A Perfect Murder by Andrew Davis., and  Jim Jarmusch's,Ghost Dog: The Way of the Samurai (1999).

Location and transportation
The Jersey City Armory is located in the Journal Square district of the city, near the Art Deco Beacon complex.

At the Journal Square Transportation Center, PATH rapid transit trains provide connections to Newark, Downtown Jersey City, Hoboken and Manhattan. Local bus connections to points in Hudson County and to the Port Authority Bus Terminal are nearby or at the train station. Montgomery – West Side buses pass the main entrance. On-site parking is not available, but numerous lots are within walking distance.

See also
Schuetzen Park
Paterson Armory
National Guard Militia Museum of New Jersey

References

External links
 Google photos of JC Armory

Sports venues in New Jersey
Buildings and structures in Jersey City, New Jersey
Buildings and structures completed in 1937
Culture of Jersey City, New Jersey
Sports in Hudson County, New Jersey
Jersey All Pro Wrestling
Tourist attractions in Jersey City, New Jersey
Armories in New Jersey
Basketball venues in New Jersey
Military installations in New Jersey
Works Progress Administration in New Jersey
Saint Peter's Peacocks men's basketball
Boxing venues in New Jersey
1937 establishments in New Jersey
Indoor arenas in New Jersey